General elections were held in Western Samoa on 4 April 1964, the first since independence in 1962. All candidates ran as independents. Following the elections, Fiamē Mataʻafa Faumuina Mulinuʻu II remained Prime Minister.

Electoral system
There were two voter rolls; one for indigenous Samoans (which was restricted to matai) and one for non-indigenous citizens, known as "individual voters". People of mixed ancestry could choose which roll to register on. As women rarely gained matai titles, it was unusual for women to be able to vote or stand for election in the Samoan seats.

Prior to the elections, the number of elected members was increased from 46 to 47; the number of Samoan seats was increased from 41 to 45, and the number of non-indigenous seats reduced from five to two. Only around 7,000 of the adult population of 45,000 was able to vote.

Campaign
A total of 107 candidates contested the elections, with only one female candidate, Lefine Satia in Faasaleleaga 3. Prime Minister Mata'afa was challenged in his Lotofaga constituency by former MLA Fonoti Ioane.

Fourteen candidates in the Samoan constituencies were returned unopposed. Only three candidates contested the two-seat individual voter constituency, all of which were incumbent MLAs.

Results
27 of the 47 elected MLAs were new to the legislature. Voter turnout was around 90% for individual voters.

Aftermath
Following the elections, Mata'afa was unanimously re-elected as Prime Minister by the Legislative Assembly. He then appointed a nine-member cabinet, including three new ministers, Papali'i Poumau, Ulualofaiga Talamaivao and Laufili Time.

See also
List of members of the Legislative Assembly of Western Samoa (1964–1967)

References

External links
Samoan election results by constituency 1964–2016 Samoa Election Results Database

Western Samoa
General
Elections in Samoa
Non-partisan elections
Western Samoa
Election and referendum articles with incomplete results